The Hartford Yard Goats are a Minor League Baseball team based in Hartford, Connecticut. The Yard Goats, which play in the Eastern League, are the Double-A affiliate of the Colorado Rockies. The team was founded in 2016 when the New Britain Rock Cats relocated to Hartford. The Yard Goats' home stadium is Dunkin' Park.

History
The franchise's timeline can be traced back to Pittsfield, Massachusetts, where they were a Boston Red Sox Double-A affiliate from 1965 to 1969. The franchise then moved to Pawtucket, Rhode Island, in 1970, where they spent three years. The Pawtucket Red Sox became a Triple-A team in 1973, and the Red Sox moved their Double-A franchise to Bristol, Connecticut. Known as the Bristol Red Sox, the team played at Muzzy Field for ten seasons from 1973 to 1982. Then known as the New Britain Red Sox, the team played its home games at Beehive Field, which stood next to New Britain Stadium. Renamed the Rock Cats in 1997, the team remained in New Britain through the 2015 season. In 2016, the team moved to Hartford and became the Yard Goats.

The Yard Goats were unable to play any games in Hartford in 2016 due to construction delays at Dunkin' Park, and instead played all of their home games on the road. These delays resulted in a lawsuit between the city of Hartford and Centerplan, the park's developer. Both sides later agreed to mediation. After the city called an insurance bond with Arch Insurance, the firm replaced Centerplan with Whiting-Turner which resumed construction in October 2016. The new developer completed the ballpark for the team's 2017 home opener on April 13, which they lost to the New Hampshire Fisher Cats, 7-2.

The nickname "Yard Goats" was selected as part of a "Name the Team" contest which drew over 6,000 submissions. "Yard goats" is rail-yard slang for the switch engines or terminal tractors that shuttle train cars between different locomotives. The stadium is adjacent to Hartford Yard. The logo features a goat chomping on a baseball bat and the team makes heavy use of animal imagery and symbolism. The blue and green colors are a nod to the Hartford Whalers team that played in the National Hockey League from 1979 to 1997.  The team stages an annual Whalers Reunion weekend, with special uniforms resembling the hockey club's and the logo has the goat chomping a hockey stick. The logo font replicates that used by the former New York, New Haven, and Hartford Railroad.

In conjunction with Major League Baseball's restructuring of Minor League Baseball in 2021, the Yard Goats were organized into the Double-A Northeast. In 2022, the Double-A Northeast became known as the Eastern League, the name historically used by the regional circuit prior to the 2021 reorganization.

Mascots
The team has two mascots, a green male goat named Chompers and a blue female goat named Chew Chew. The names were selected as part of a "Name the Mascot" contest. Chew Chew's name is designed to reflect both the railroad meaning of the nickname (as in choo choo train) and the goat logo, which is chewing on a baseball bat.

On April 21, 2016, Hartford Police reported that an individual had tackled Chompers outside the Connecticut Science Center after an event there. The man inside the costume, who was not named, was uninjured. Police are unsure whether it was an intentional assault or a prank that went too far.

Broadcasts
Hartford Yard Goats games are heard on AM 1410 WPOP in English and were formerly heard on AM 1120 WPRX in Spanish.
The Public Address Announcer is Jared Doyon.

Season records
(Place indicates finish in Eastern/Northeast Division)
2016: 74-67 (3rd), manager Darin Everson
2017: 62-77 (5th), manager Jerry Weinstein
2018: 65-71 (3rd), manager Warren Schaeffer
2019: 73-66 (3rd), manager Warren Schaeffer
2020: Season canceled due to COVID-19 pandemic
2021: 39-79 (6th), manager Chris Denorfia
2022: 77-60 (2nd), manager Chris Denorfia

Roster

References

External links

 Official website

 
Eastern League (1938–present) teams
Sports in Hartford, Connecticut
Baseball teams established in 2016
Colorado Rockies minor league affiliates
Professional baseball teams in Connecticut
2016 establishments in Connecticut
Double-A Northeast teams